Cultural Studies ↔ Critical Methodologies is a bimonthly peer-reviewed academic journal that covers research methods in the field of cultural studies. The journal's editor-in-chief is Norman K. Denzin (University of Illinois). It was established in 2001 and is published by SAGE Publications.

Abstracting and indexing 
The journal is abstracted and indexed in:
 International Bibliography of the Social Sciences
 SafetyLit
 Scopus
 Sociological Abstracts

References

External links 
 

SAGE Publishing academic journals
English-language journals
Cultural journals
Bimonthly journals
Publications established in 2001